Jacques Chardonne (born Jacques Boutelleau; 2 January 1884, in Barbezieux-Saint-Hilaire, Charente – 29 May 1968, in La Frette-sur-Seine) is the pseudonym of French writer Jacques Boutelleau. He was a member of the so-called Groupe de Barbezieux.

Early life and career 
Raised Protestant, his American Quaker mother was an heiress to the Haviland porcelain dynasty and his father was French.  His brother-in-law was of the Delamain cognac dynasty. This informed his trilogy Les Destinées Sentimentales. He was a leader of the Hussards and held in high regard for the award-winning Claire.

World War II 
He supported collaboration with the Vichy and in 1940 produced "Private Chronicle 1940", which favored the submission of Europe to Adolf Hitler. He was a member of the Groupe Collaboration, an initiative that encouraged close cultural ties between France and Germany. After World War II he was denounced for Nazi collaboration and spent time in prison. In an article titled "Jacques Chardonne et Mein Kampf" the 'Frenchness' of his writing was also questioned.

Death and rehabilitation 
He died in 1968 after efforts to restore his image. By the 1980s anti-totalitarian journalists like Raymond Aron began to reappraise collaborationist authors like Chardonne. In 1986 his award-winning Claire was made into a TV film and in 2001 Olivier Assayas adapted Les Destinées Sentimentales to film.

Awards 
1932 Grand Prix du roman de l'Académie française, with Claire (Grasset)
The Prix Jacques-Chardonne established in 1986 is named after him.

References 

1884 births
1968 deaths
People from Charente
French Protestants
French collaborators with Nazi Germany
French fascists
20th-century French novelists
20th-century French male writers
Writers from Nouvelle-Aquitaine
French male novelists
Grand Prix du roman de l'Académie française winners